Squash at the 2011 Pacific Games in Nouméa, New Caledonia was held on August 29–September 9, 2011.

Medal summary

Medal table

Men

Women

Mixed

References

Squash at the 2011 Pacific Games

2011 Pacific Games
Pacific Games
2011